Ali Shams al-Din ibn al-Husayn Husam al-Din  (died on 21 Zilqad 933 AH /1527 AD), Zabeed, Yemen, was the 22nd Da'i al-Mutlaq (Absolute Missionary) of Tayyibi Isma'ilism.

Life
His incumbency was among the shortest of all Dais lasting more than a month. He was the successor to the 21st Dai Syedna Husain Husamuddin to the religious post.

Syedna Ali had an amicable personality. He summoned people collectively and individually, inquiring about their well-being, giving them valuable advice and guiding towards the right part.

Burial
He is buried in Masaar, Yemen.

References

Sources
 
Lathan, Young, Religion, Learning and Science
Bacharach, Joseph W. Meri, Medieval Islamic Civilisation

Year of birth unknown
1527 deaths
16th century in Yemen
Banu al-Walid al-Anf
Tayyibi da'is
16th-century Arabs
16th-century Ismailis
16th-century Islamic religious leaders